Lt. Col. Sir John Smith-Burges, 1st Baronet (c. 173424 April 1803) was Chairman of the East India Company in 1791.

Life

Smith-Burges was a director of the East India Company. He was Lieutenant-Colonel in the service of the 3rd Regiment, East India Volunteers.

He was the son of John Smith and Mary Ransom. Sir John married Margaret Burges, daughter of Ynyr Burges and Margaret Brown, on 14 May 1771. He was born John Smith and changed his name by Royal Licence on 10 June 1790 to John Smith-Burges. He was created 1st Baronet Smith-Burges, of Eastham, (in the county of Essex) on 4 May 1793. Sir John had no male heir and so the title became extinct on his death.

References

British East India Company
Directors of the British East India Company
British East India Company people
British Indian history
Date of birth unknown
Year of birth uncertain
1730s births
1803 deaths